Ho Burr (born 23 September 1992) is a Hong Kong cyclist, who most recently rode for UCI Continental team .

Major results
Source: 

2012
 1st Stage 3 Tour de East Java
 Asian Under-23 Road Championships
3rd  Time trial
4th Road race
2013
 National Road Championships
1st  Under-23 road race
2nd Road race
2014
 2nd Time trial, National Under-23 Road Championships
 4th Overall Jelajah Malaysia
1st  Asian rider classification
2015
 National Road Championships
3rd Road race
3rd Time trial
2016
 3rd Road race, National Road Championships
2017
 Asian Road Championships
3rd  Team time trial
5th Road race
 3rd Road race, National Road Championships
2018
 National Road Championships
1st  Time trial
3rd Road race
 Asian Road Championships
3rd  Team time trial
4th Road race
2020
 9th Overall Cambodia Bay Cycling Tour

References

External links

1992 births
Living people
Hong Kong male cyclists
Cyclists at the 2014 Asian Games
Cyclists at the 2018 Asian Games
Asian Games competitors for Hong Kong